Edward Jenkins may refer to:

 Ed Jenkins (American football) (born 1950), former American football wide receiver
 Ed Jenkins, fictional protagonist of a series of novelettes by Erle Stanley Gardner
 Edward Jenkins (MP) (1838–1910), author and Member of Parliament (MP) for Dundee 1874–1880
 Edward Jenkins (priest) (1902–1996), Anglican Dean of St David's
 Edward Enoch Jenkins, Attorney General of Fiji (1938–1945)
Edward Hopkins Jenkins (1850–1931), American agricultural chemist

See also
 
 Ed Jenkins (disambiguation)
 Jenkins (disambiguation)